Hammamlu or Hamamlu may refer to:
 Hammamlu, Ardabil
 Hamamlu, East Azerbaijan
 Hammamlu-e Bala, Zanjan Province
 Hammamlu-e Pain, Zanjan Province